"Mme Pavoshko" is a song by Black M from his 2014 studio album Les Yeux plus gros que le monde. The song was also released as a single.

Writing and composition 
The song was written by Renaud Rebillaud and Black M.

Track listing 
Promo digital single (2014) – Wati B / Jive (Sony)
 "Mme Pavoshko" (4:15)

Charts

Weekly charts

Year-end charts

References 

2014 songs
2014 singles
Black M songs
French songs
Jive Records singles
Songs written by Renaud Rebillaud